The 2018 Challenge Cup Final was the 117th cup-deciding game of the rugby league 2018 Challenge Cup Season. It was held at Wembley Stadium in London on 25 August 2018, kick off 15:00. The final was contested by Catalans Dragons and Warrington Wolves. The game saw Catalans Dragons beat Warrington Wolves by 20 points to 14 and saw the Dragons win the competition for the first time.

Background
This would be Catalans Dragons second appearance in a Challenge Cup Final having come runners-up to St Helens during the 2007 Challenge Cup Final. By contrast, this would be 18th cup final and the 5th of the Super League era, having most recently achieving a runners-up place in 2016, and winning the competition in 2009, 2010, and 2012.

Route to the final

Catalans Dragons
Having played in the qualifiers during the 2017 Super League, Catalans Dragons entered in one round earlier than their finalist opponents. In the fifth round they drew eventual League 1 champions York City Knights who they beat 34–22. The sixth round saw them face a second League 1 team, Whitehaven who they thrashed 56 points to 10. The quarter finals saw the Dragons play Super League side Huddersfield Giants beating them 20 points to six. In the semi-finals, Catalans Dragons beat eventual Super League league leaders St Helens 53 points to 16 to reach the final.

Warrington Wolves
Warrington Wolves drew Championship side Toronto Wolfpack, thrashing them 66–10, before nilling rivals Wigan Warriors, scoring 23 points, to reach the semi-finals. The semi-final saw the Wolves comfortably beat relegation threatened Leeds Rhinos 48-12 to reach the final.

Match details

Post match
As winners of the 2018 Challenge Cup Final, Catalans Dragons became the first non-English team to win the tournament. Unfortunately, the match attendance of 50,672 was the lowest since the second world war. The presence of Catalans Dragons, a French team, in the final was thought to be a factor; despite an attendance of almost 35,000 more making the journey to Wembley for the 2007 Challenge Cup Final where the Dragons finished as runners-up.

References

Challenge Cup finals
Challenge Cup final
Challenge Cup final
Warrington Wolves matches
August 2018 sports events in the United Kingdom